The American tree sparrow (Spizelloides arborea), also known as the winter sparrow, is a medium-sized New World sparrow.

It had been classified under the genus Spizella, but multilocus molecular evidence suggested placement in its own genus.

Description 
Measurements:

 Length: 5.5 in (14 cm)
 Weight: 0.5-1.0 oz (13-28 g)
 Wingspan: 9.4 in (24 cm)

Adults have a rusty cap and grey underparts with a small dark spot on the breast. They have a rusty back with lighter stripes, brown wings with white bars and a slim tail. Their face is grey with a rusty line through the eye. Their flanks are splashed with light brown. They are similar in appearance to the chipping sparrow. Due to this, they are sometimes also called the winter chippy.

Their breeding habitat is tundra or the northern limits of the boreal forest in Alaska and northern Canada. They nest on the ground.

These birds migrate into southern Canada and the United States to spend the winter. Usually, chipping sparrows are moving south around the same time as these birds arrive.

These birds forage on the ground or in low bushes, often in flocks when not nesting. They mainly eat seeds and insects, but also eat some berries. They are commonly seen near feeders with dark-eyed juncos.

This bird's song is a sweet high warble descending in pitch and becoming buzzy near the finish.

References

 Slager, D.L.; Klicka, J. 2014: A new genus for the American tree sparrow (Aves: Passeriformes: Passerellidae). Zootaxa, 3821(3): 398–400.

Further reading

Book

 Naugler, C. T. 1993. American Tree Sparrow (Spizella arborea). In The Birds of North America, No. 37. (A. Poole, P. Stettenheim, and F. Gill, Eds.). Philadelphia: The Academy of Natural Sciences; Washington, DC: The American Ornithologists' Union.

Thesis

 Heydweiller AM. Ph.D. (1936). LIFE HISTORY OF THE TREE SPARROW, SPIZELLA ARBOREA. Cornell University, United States, New York.
 Naugler CT. M.Sc. (1992). Effects of the acoustic environment on song structure and song recognition in the American tree sparrow (Spizella arborea). Queen's University at Kingston (Canada), Canada.

Articles
 Cusick EK & Wilson FE. (1972). On Control of Spontaneous Testicular Regression in Tree Sparrows Spizella-Arborea. General & Comparative Endocrinology. vol 19, no 3. pp. 441–456.
 Delisle JM & Savidge JA. (1997). Avian use and vegetation characteristics of conservation reserve program fields. Journal of Wildlife Management. vol 61, no 2. pp. 318–325.
 Durairaj G & Martin EW. (1970). Fatty-Acid Composition of the Tree Sparrow Spizella-Arborea. American Zoologist. vol 10, no 3.
 Hannah KC. (2005). An apparent case of cooperative hunting in immature Northern Shrikes. Wilson Bulletin. vol 117, no 4. pp. 407–409.
 Helms CW & Smythe RB. (1969). Variation in Major Body Components of the Tree Sparrow Spizella-Arborea Sampled within the Winter Range. Wilson Bulletin. vol 81, no 3. pp. 280–292.
 Keiper RR. (1969). Causal Factors of Stereotypies in Caged Birds Serinus-Canarius Serinus-Mozambicus Serinus-Leucopygius Spizella-Arborea Junco-Hyemalis Cyanocitta-Cristata Rearing. Animal Behaviour. vol 17, no 1. pp. 114–119.
 Martin EW. (1968). The Effects of Dietary Protein on the Energy and Nitrogen Balance of the Tree Sparrow Spizella-Arborea-Arborea. Physiological Zoology. vol 41, no 3. pp. 313–331.
 Morrison JV & Wilson FE. (1972). Ovarian Growth in Tree Sparrows Spizella-Arborea. Auk. vol 89, no 1. pp. 146–155.
 Paton PWC & Pogson TH. (1996). Relative abundance, migration strategy, and habitat use of birds breeding in Denali National Park, Alaska. Canadian Field-Naturalist. vol 110, no 4. pp. 599–606.
 Stuebe MM & Ketterson ED. (1982). A STUDY OF FASTING IN TREE SPARROWS (SPIZELLA-ARBOREA) AND DARK-EYED JUNCOS (JUNCO-HYEMALIS) - ECOLOGICAL IMPLICATIONS. Auk. vol 99, no 2. pp. 299–308.

External links

American tree sparrow species account - Cornell Lab of Ornithology
American tree sparrow - Spizella arborea - USGS Patuxent Bird Identification InfoCenter
 
 
 

American tree sparrow
Native birds of Alaska
Birds of Canada
American tree sparrow
Taxa named by Alexander Wilson (ornithologist)